Ruth Harriet Louise (born Ruth Goldstein; January 13, 1903 – October 12, 1940) was an American photographer. She was the first woman photographer active in Hollywood, and she ran Metro-Goldwyn-Mayer's portrait studio from 1925 to 1930.

Early life and career 
Ruth Harriet Louise was born Ruth Goldstein in New York City and raised in New Brunswick, New Jersey.  She was the daughter of Klara Jacobson Sandrich Goldstein, who was born in Rajec, Hungary (present-day Slovakia) and Jacob Goldstein, who was a rabbi originally from England. Her brother was director Mark Sandrich, and she was a cousin of silent film actress Carmel Myers.

Louise began working as a portrait photographer in 1922, working out of a music store down the block from the New Brunswick temple at which her father was a rabbi. Most of her photographs from this period are of family members and members of her father's temple congregation.

In 1925, she moved to Los Angeles and set up a small photo studio on Hollywood and Vine. Louise's first published Hollywood photo was of Vilma Banky in costume for Dark Angel, and appeared in Photoplay magazine in September 1925. 

When Louise was hired by MGM as chief portrait photographer, she was twenty-two years old, and the only woman working as a portrait photographer for the Hollywood studios. In a career that lasted only five years, Louise photographed all the stars, contract players, and many of the hopefuls who passed through the studio's front gates, including Greta Garbo (Louise was one of only seven photographers permitted to make portraits of her), Lon Chaney, John Gilbert, Joan Crawford, Marion Davies, Anna May Wong, Nina Mae McKinney, and Norma Shearer. It is estimated she took more than 100,000 photos during her tenure at MGM. Today she is considered an equal with George Hurrell Sr. and other renowned glamour photographers of the era.

In addition to paying close attention to costume and setting for studio photographs, Louise also incorporated aspects of modernist movements such as Cubism, futurism, and German expressionism into her studio portraits.

Although during this time photographers would not get full recognition of their work, Ruth would stamp the back of each photograph that was printed with her full name. A female photographer in a highly dominated male industry, she made sure that her work was acknowledged.

Personal life and death 
Louise married writer and director Leigh Jason in 1927 at Temple B'nai B'rith, with William Wyler as Jason's best man. Although in 1930 her contract with MGM was not renewed and the position of chief portrait photographer went to George Hurrell, Louise continued working through 1932, and her last recorded photo session was with actress Anna Sten. 

In 1932, she gave birth to a son, Leigh Jason Jr., who died in 1938 of leukemia when he was six years old. In 1938, her occupation was listed as "housewife" and she was registered as a Democrat. She died, along with her second son, in 1940 of complications from childbirth, and she was buried with her sons at Home of Peace Cemetery.

Further reading 
 Dance, R.; Robertson, B.: Ruth Harriet Louise and Hollywood Glamour Photography, Univ. of California Press 2002; .
 Kobal, John. Hollywood Glamor Portraits: 145 Photos of Stars, 1926-1949. Courier Corporation, 1976. .
 Vieira, Mark A. George Hurrell's Hollywood: Glamour Portraits 1925-1992. Running Press, 2013. .

Notes

External links 

 The Ruth Harriet Louise Collection
 Ruth Harriet Louise on Flickr.
 Greta Garbo and Louise: When they met... 
 Greta Garbo photographs by Ruth Harriet Louise.
 

1903 births
1940 deaths
American portrait photographers
Photographers from California
Artists from Los Angeles
20th-century American Jews
20th-century American photographers
Deaths in childbirth
20th-century American women photographers
California Democrats